The 2020–21 Fairleigh Dickinson Knights men's basketball team represented Fairleigh Dickinson University in the 2020–21 NCAA Division I men's basketball season. The Knights, led by eighth-year head coach Greg Herenda, will play their home games at the Rothman Center in Hackensack, New Jersey as members of the Northeast Conference. In a season limited due to the ongoing COVID-19 pandemic, the Knights finished the season 9–15, 8–10 in NEC play to finish eighth place. They failed to qualify for the NEC tournament.

Previous season
The Knights finished the 2019–20 season 11–19, 9–9 in NEC play to finish in a tie for fifth place. They lost in the quarterfinals of the NEC tournament to LIU.

Roster

Schedule and results 

|-
!colspan=12 style=| Regular season

|-

Source

References

Fairleigh Dickinson Knights men's basketball seasons
Fairleigh Dickinson Knights
Fairleigh Dickinson Knights men's basketball
Fairleigh Dickinson Knights men's basketball